The 1885–86 season was the 15th season of competitive football in England.

National team
England were joint winners of the 1886 British Home Championship with Scotland.

 
* England score given first

Key
 A = Away match
 BHC = British Home Championship

Note – see Talk page re query on goalscorers against Wales.

Events
 Millwall Rovers were formed, and play their first match on 3 October 1885. After a couple of name changes and moves, the club will eventually become known as Millwall.

Honours

Notes = Number in parentheses is the times that club has won that honour. * indicates new record for competition

External links
Report on Ireland v England match on thefa.com
Report on Scotland v England match on thefa.com
Report on Wales v England match on thefa.com
Report on Scotland v England match